Useme is a Polish fintech company based in Wrocław. The company owns platform and job marketplace Useme.com.

Useme was founded on June 28, 2013, in Wroclaw by Przemysław Głośny. Initially, it operated as a limited liability company. On February 4, 2021, a joint-stock company Useme SA was also created. From the beginning, the company was running Useme.com (formerly Useme.eu). In 2013, it has received 700,000 zlotys of funding (including about 480,000 in a non-refundable grant) from EU funds.

In October 2021, the company began issuing shares through the equity crowdfunding platform Crowdway. The stated purpose of the equity issue was to raise PLN 2,499,210, which, together with the company's own funds, would enable the development of the service's technology, automation of settlements and foreign expansion. In the end, Useme raised PLN 1,078,182. At the time of the information campaign accompanying the share issue, the company said it was considering a stock market listing in 2023.

In 2020, the company generated revenue of PLN 32,445,703.64 and closed the year with a loss of PLN 254,944.74. This represents a 49% increase compared to 2019. In the second quarter of 2021, Useme generated 86% growth compared to last year's period. This translates into 168,923.13 zlotys of profit for that half-year.

Useme.com 
Useme.com is the first platform in Poland and the largest in Central Europe  to connect freelancers with contractors and mediate the settlement of remote work contracts. The platform is sometimes mentioned in guidebooks and websites for freelancers.

Useme.com aims to allow users to issue a VAT invoice without setting up a business. The service acts as an intermediary in settling freelancer's contract with the client and entering into a work contract with the freelancer. In turn, the client receives a VAT invoice issued by Useme.com on behalf of the freelancer. Useme.com also allows users to post an offer on a job exchange. Principals can then choose a contractor from those who apply (bidding contest) and settle the work through the platform.

Useme’s creators produce the "Freelancing in Poland" survey and report, published annually since 2014. The Computer Assisted Web Interview (CAWI) method is used to collect data for the report.

From August 2022 to January 1, 2023, the platform was allowing Ukrainians living in Poland to settle contracts for free.

References 

Companies based in Wrocław
Polish companies established in 2013
Online companies of Poland
Financial services companies established in 2013
Online financial services companies
Freelance marketplace websites